The Cypriot Basketball Cup is an annual professional basketball national cup competition, organized by the Cyprus Basketball Federation since 1969.

Format
Starting in 2007, the Cypriot Cup competition's format changed to where only teams from the Cypriot A Division compete at the cup. The cup employs a knock-out stage and a final four format. The Cup's winner automatically qualifies to compete in the next season of the FIBA Europe Cup competition.

Teams
The following six teams (in alphabetical order) competed in the 2018–19 season:

AEK Larnaca - Larnaca
APOEL - Nicosia
Apollon Limassol - Limassol
Enosis Neon Paralimni - Paralimni
ETHA Engomis - Engomi, Nicosia
Keravnos - Strovolos, Nicosia
Omonoia - Nicosia
AEL Limassol - Limassol

Cup winners

1969 – Pezoporikos
1970 – Pezoporikos
1971 – Pezoporikos
1972 – Pezoporikos
1973 – APOEL
1974 – Achilleas
1975 – Achilleas
1976 – Achilleas
1977 – Achilleas
1978 – AEL
1979 – APOEL
1980 – AEL
1981 – AEL
1982 – AEL
1983 – AEL
1984 – APOEL
1985 – AEL
1986 – APOEL
1987 – ENAD
1988 – Achilleas
1989 – Keravnos
1990 – Achilleas
1991 – APOEL
1992 – Pezoporikos
1993 – APOEL
1994 – APOEL
1995 – APOEL
1996 – APOEL
1997 – Keravnos
1998 – Keravnos
1999 – Keravnos
2000 – Achilleas
2001 – APOEL
2002 – Apollon
2003 – APOEL
2004 – AEL
2005 – Keravnos
2006 – Keravnos
2007 – Keravnos
2008 – AEL
2009 – AEL
2010 – Keravnos
2011 – ETHA
2012 – Keravnos
2013 – ETHA
2014 – Apollon
2015 – ETHA
2016 – APOEL
2017 – AEK Larnaca
2018 – AEK Larnaca
2019 – Keravnos
2021 – AEK Larnaca
2022 – Keravnos

Most Valuable Players (Cup Finals)
2013 –  Ivan Maraš – ETHA Engomis
2014 –  Grigoris Pantouris – Apollon Limassol
2015 –  Chris Ferguson – ETHA
2016 –  Tyrell Biggs – APOEL
2017 –  Primož Brezec – AEK Larnaca
2018 –  Tyreek Duren – AEK Larnaca
2019 –  Darrel Willis – Keravnos
2022 –  Derek Ogbeide – Keravnos

Performance by club

See also
 Cyprus Basketball Division A
 Cypriot Basketball Super Cup

References

Basketball competitions in Cyprus
Basketball cup competitions in Europe